Imam Khomeini Hospital or also Hezar Takhtkhabi Hospital Center is a teaching hospital complex and biomedical research facility of Tehran University of Medical Sciences, located in Tehran, Iran.

History
A reputed German company took the responsibility of building the hospital being composed of the present Imam Khomeini Hospital, infections diseases ward and that of the Cancer Institute from 1938 to 1941.
before Iranian Revolution called 1000 beds hospital that biggest hospital in Iran.

Structure

It is including Imam Khomeini Hospital and Vali-Asr Hospital and Cancer Institute. This complex hospital presently has 242 faculty members, 4000 administrative and clinical staff, 1300 active beds.

References

Hospital buildings completed in 1941
Hospitals in Iran
Buildings and structures in Tehran
Hospitals established in 1941